Dušan Makavejev (13 October 1932 – 25 January 2019) was a Serbian film director and screenwriter, famous for his groundbreaking films of Yugoslav cinema in the late 1960s and early 1970s—many of which belong to the Black Wave. Makavejev's most internationally successful film was the 1971 political satire W.R.: Mysteries of the Organism, which he both directed and wrote.

Career
Makavejev's first three feature films, Man Is Not a Bird (1965, starring actress and icon of the "Black Wave" period in film, Milena Dravić), Love Affair, or the Case of the Missing Switchboard Operator (1967, starring actress and icon of the "Black Wave" period in film, Eva Ras) and Innocence Unprotected (1968), all won him international acclaim. The last-mentioned won  the Silver Bear Extraordinary Prize of the Jury at the 18th Berlin International Film Festival. In 1970 he was a member of the jury at the 20th Berlin International Film Festival. In 1991 he was a member of the jury at the 17th Moscow International Film Festival.

His 1971 movie W.R.: Mysteries of the Organism (starring Milena Dravić, Jagoda Kaloper, and Ivica Vidović) was banned in Yugoslavia due to its sexual and political content. He described authoritarian figures in the film as people who are not in control of themselves striving to control others. The political scandal surrounding Makavejev's film was symptomatic of an increasingly oppressive political climate in Yugoslavia that effectively ended the director's domestic career and resulted in his leaving Yugoslavia to live and work abroad in Europe and North America. Makavejev's next film, Sweet Movie (1974), was the first feature work that the director produced entirely outside of Yugoslavia (the film was made in Canada). Sweet Movie's explicit depiction of sex together with its bold treatment of the more taboo dimensions of sexuality reduced the size of the film's audience (i.e. it was largely confined to the art house context) and also resulted in the film's being censored in several countries.

After a seven-year hiatus in feature film production, Makavejev released the comparatively more conventional black comedy entitled Montenegro (1981). The director's next feature film, The Coca-Cola Kid (1985), which was based on short stories by Frank Moorhouse and featured performances by Eric Roberts and Greta Scacchi, is arguably his most accessible picture.

Makavejev appears as one of the narrators in the 2007 Serbian documentary film Zabranjeni bez zabrane (Banned without being banned), which gives profound insight into the history and the nature of Yugoslav film censorship through its investigation of the country's distinctive political-cultural mechanisms for unofficially banning politically controversial films. The film contains original interviews with key filmmakers from the communist era.

He published two books of selected articles: Poljubac za drugaricu parolu (1960) and 24 sličice u sekundi (1965).

Views

In 1993 Makavejev wrote and appeared in a half hour televised Opinions lecture in Britain, produced by Open Media for Channel 4 and subsequently published in The Times. Makavejev speaks of himself as a citizen of the world but "of the leftovers of Yugoslavia too". He cites Jacques Tourneur's Hollywood horror classic Cat People as one of the rare films in the history of the cinema that mention Serbs, "a people from an obscure region who were haunted by evil; when hurt they turn into ferocious cats, like panthers, and killed those whom they thought to be the source of hurt of rejection". He comments on the division of Bosnia on ethnic lines:

"Creators of nationalist myths, both Serbs and Croats, came from the same mountainous region that was probably the source of this Hollywood story. Before the armed conflict, these people were whipping up nationalist fever and indoctrination until conflict became inevitable and both nations were trapped in a bloody embrace...How long will it take for an ethnically "clean" state for every single person who miraculously stays alive? A state for each family, a state for the father in case he is a Croat, a state for the mother in case she is a Muslim, a state for the daughter in case she is a Yugoslav, a state for the son in case he is a Serb, a specific flag for the dog, a currency for the cat."

Filmography
Feature films

Short films
Jatgan mala (1953)
Pečat (1955)
Antonijevo razbijeno ogledalo (1957)
Spomenicima ne treba verovati (1958)
Osmjeh '61 (1961)
Eci peci pec (1961)
Parada (1962)
Nova domaća životinja (1964)

References

Sources
 Article on Man Is Not a Bird in Senses of Cinema:  Gleaming Faces, Dark Realities: Dušan Makavejev's Man Is Not a Bird and the Representation of the Working Class after Socialist Realism.
Gleaming Faces, Dark Realities: Dušan Makavejev's Man Is Not a Bird and the Representation of the Working Class after Socialist Realism by Constantin Parvulescu
Betrayed Promises: Politics and Sexual Revolution in the Films of Márta Mészáros, Miloš Forman, and Dušan Makavejev by Constantin Parvulescu

External links
 .
 Dušan Makavejev biography.
 Interview - a Hungarian interview.
 English-language interview (2000).
 Goran Markovic Горан Марковиќ "Dušan Makavejev or a Free Man". 
 Critical Review.
 A photograph of Dušan Makavejev: .
  Man Is Not a Bird (TCM Movie Morlocks).
 Literature on Dusan Makavejev.
 Senses of Cinema interview of Dusan Makavejev.

1932 births
2019 deaths
Film people from Belgrade
Serbian film directors
Yugoslav film directors
Serbian satirists
English-language film directors
French-language film directors